Aploderus is a genus of beetles belonging to the family Staphylinidae.

The genus was first described by Stephens in 1833.

The species of this genus are found in Europe and Northern America.

Species:
 Aploderus caelatus
 Aploderus caesus''

References

Oxytelinae
Staphylinidae genera
Beetles of North America
Beetles of Europe